The Hampshire Field Club & Archaeological Society is a local history and archaeological society for Hampshire, England. It was founded in 1885 by Thomas W. Shore. It publishes a newsletter, monographs and other longer publications, and a journal  Hampshire Studies: Proceedings of the Hampshire Field Club and Archaeological Society. The society has published the second series of Hampshire Papers since 2015, following on from the first series which was published by the Hampshire Record Office between 1991 and 2010.

Selected publications

Monographs
 The Archaeology of Hampshire, S.J. Shennan and R.T. Schadla-Hall (eds) (1980)
 The Prehistoric Settlement at Winnall Down, Winchester, P.J. Fasham (1985)
 Excavations on the Romano-British Small Town at Neatham, Hampshire, Martin Millett and David Graham (1986)
 An Anglo-Saxon Cemetery at Alton, Hampshire, V.I. Evison (1988)
 A Banjo Enclosure in Micheldever Wood, Hampshire, P.J. Fasham (1987)
 The Archaeological Site at Easton Lane, Winchester, P.J. Fasham, D.E. Farwell and R.J.B. Whinney (1989)
 Archaeology and the M3, P.J. Fasham and R.J.B. Whinney (1991)
 Romsey Abbey, Report on the Excavations, 1973-91, I.R. Scott (1997)
 Twyford Down, Hampshire: Archaeological Investigations on the M3 Motorway from Bar End to Compton, 1990-93, K.E. Walker and D.E. Farwell (2000)
 Basing House, Hampshire. Excavations 1978-1991, D. Allen and S. Anderson (1999)
 Sparsholt Roman Villa, Hampshire (Please see above.), D.E. Johnston & J. Dicks (2014)
 Selborne Priory (Please see above.) D. Baker (2015)

References

External links 

Clubs and societies in Hampshire
History of Hampshire
1885 establishments in England
Archaeological organizations